Road Scholars is the second live album by the American jazz group Spyro Gyra, released in 1998 by GRP Records. The final track, "Best Friends," is a studio recording.

Track listing 
 "Heart of the Night" (Jay Beckenstein) – 6:41
 "Breakfast at Igor's" (Beckenstein) – 7:20
 "Morning Dance" (Beckenstein) – 4:16
 "Shaker Song" (Beckenstein) – 10:15
 "Shanghai Gumbo" (Julio Fernandez) – 6:28
 "Innocent Soul" (Tom Schuman) – 6:28
 "South American Sojourn" (Joel Rosenblatt) – 5:36
 "Ariana" (Jeremy Wall) – 6:07
 "De la Luz" (Fernandez) – 8:24
 "Daddy's Got a New Girl Now" (Beckenstein) – 6:01
 "Best Friends" (Scott Kreitzer, Randy Andos) – 4:04

Personnel 

Spyro Gyra
 Jay Beckenstein – saxophones
 Tom Schuman – keyboards
 Julio Fernández – guitars, vocals (9)
 Scott Ambush – bass guitar
 Joel Rosenblatt – drums, percussion

Additional musicians
 Jason Miles – drum programming (11)

Production 
 Jay Beckenstein – producer 
 Bill Heinzlmeir – monitor engineer, tape operator
 Al Oestreich – engineer (11)
 Ian Fraser – assistant engineer (11)
 Doug Oberkircher – mixing (11)
 Scott Hull – mastering 
 John Caron – production manager 
 Steve Byram – art direction, design
 Hollis King – art direction
 David Blankenship – photography
 Alan Nahigian – photography

References

External links
Spyro Gyra-Road Scholars at Discogs
Spyro Gyra-Road Scholars at AllMusic
Spyro Gyra official web site

1998 albums
GRP Records albums
Spyro Gyra albums